Matthew A. McGee (December 1890 - October 28, 1949) was an American jockey born and raised in Covington, Kentucky who rode Durbar to victory in the 1914 Epsom Derby, England's most prestigious race, for Herman B. Duryea. Based in France his other winners for Duryea included the 1913 French 1000 Guineas (the Poule d'Essai des Pouliches) on Banshee. Afterwards he rode for several years for Baron Edouard de Rothschild up to 1927.  

Note that his name is frequently misspelled as "MacGee" in European records, including the Media Guide for the Epsom Derby and on a 1923 sports card. His temporary licenses to ride in England were issued in the name of "Matthew A MacGee" and later "Mathew A MacGee".

References

 1890 births
 1949 deaths
American expatriates in France
 American jockeys
 People from Covington, Kentucky